Pendulum is a 1969 American neo noir crime thriller film directed by George Schaefer and starring George Peppard, Jean Seberg and Richard Kiley.

Plot
In Washington, D.C., police captain Frank Matthews's career is on the rise, having just been appointed consultant for a powerful U.S. senator. His domestic life, however, is questionable. He suspects his wife of having an affair with an old flame. One evening, after appearing at a political function in Baltimore, Matthews decides not to return home until the following morning. The next day, he is informed by authorities that his wife has been discovered shot to death while in bed with her lover, who was also killed. Soon, Matthews is made aware that his own colleagues, the police, have made him the prime suspect in the case.

Pendulum also features a side-plot involving a death row inmate, Paul Sanderson, convicted of rape and murder, who is set free due to a legal technicality. Sanderson had been originally tracked down and arrested by Matthews, who views these circumstances as a grave injustice. Ironically, now that Captain Matthews is a suspected murderer, he hires Sanderson's lawyer, Woodrow Wilson King, to represent him. For the remainder of the feature, these two storylines intersect until the film reaches its violent conclusion.

Cast
 George Peppard as Capt. Frank Matthews 
 Jean Seberg as Adele Matthews 
 Richard Kiley as Woodrow Wilson King 
 Charles McGraw as Deputy Chief John P. Hildebrand 
 Madeleine Sherwood as Mrs. Eileen Sanderson 
 Robert F. Lyons as Paul Martin Sanderson 
 Frank Marth as Lt. Smithson 
 Marj Dusay as Liz Tennant 
 Paul McGrath as Senator Augustus Cole 
 Stewart Moss as Richard D'Angelo 
 Isabel Sanford as Effie 
 Dana Elcar as Det. J.J. 'Red' Thornton
 Harry Lewis as Brooks Elliot
 Mildred Trares as Mary Schumacher 
 Robin Raymond as Myra
 Phyllis Hill as Mrs. Wilma Elliot
 S. John Launer as Judge Kinsella 
 Jock Mackelvie as U.S. Attorney Grady Butler 
 Richard Guizon as Deputy Marshall Jack Barnes 
 Jack Grimes as Artie
 Logan Ramsey as Detective Jelinek
 Douglas Henderson as Detective Hanauer
 Gene Boland as Garland

Legacy
In 2019, the film is referenced in Quentin Tarantino's film Once Upon a Time in Hollywood, on a movie theater marquee that Sharon Tate walks past just before first seeing her own name on the marquee display of The Wrecking Crew at the Fox Bruin Theater.

References

External links

Pendulum at TCMDB

1969 films
Columbia Pictures films
Films directed by George Schaefer
Films scored by Walter Scharf
1960s English-language films
1960s thriller films
American thriller films
1960s American films